The 2014–15 CEV Cup was the 43rd edition of the European CEV Cup volleyball club tournament.

In finals Dinamo Moscow beat Energy T.I. Diatec Trentino in golden set, after winning home match and compensation of losses after the first match. Russian opposite Pavel Kruglov from Dinamo Moscow was awarded Most Valuable Player title.

Participating teams
The number of participants on the basis of ranking list for European Cup Competitions:

Main phase

16th Final
The 16 winning teams from the 16th Final competed in the 8th Final playing home & away matches. The losers of the 16th Final matches qualified for the main phase in Challenge Cup.

|}

8th Final

|}

First leg

|}

Second leg

|}

4th Final

|}

First leg

|}

Second leg

|}

Challenge phase

|}

First leg 

|}

Second leg 

|}

Final phase

Semi finals

|}

First leg

|}

Second leg

|}

Final

First leg

|}

Second leg

|}

Final standing

References

External links
 Official site

2014-15
2014 in volleyball
2015 in volleyball